Carl Frederik Pedersen (30 September 1884 – 3 September 1968) was a Danish rower who competed in the 1912 Summer Olympics.

He was the strokeman of the Danish boat, which won the gold medal in the coxed four, inriggers.

References

External links
profile

1884 births
1968 deaths
Danish male rowers
Rowers at the 1912 Summer Olympics
Olympic rowers of Denmark
Olympic gold medalists for Denmark
Olympic medalists in rowing
Medalists at the 1912 Summer Olympics